Earley is a surname. Notable people with the surname include:

Arnold Earley (1933–1999), American baseball pitcher
Arthur Earley (1925–1981), American politician
Ashley Earley (born 1983), American basketball player
Bill Earley (born 1956), American baseball catcher
Candice Earley (1950–2019), American actress
Charity Adams Earley, (1918–2002) African-American militarian 
Darnell Earley, American politician 
Dermot Earley Jnr (born 1978), Irish Gaelic footballer
Dermot Earley Snr (1948–2010), Irish army officer
Jay Earley, American computer scientist
John Joseph Earley (1881–1945), American architect
Kevin Earley, American actor
Mark Earley (born 1954), American politician 
Martin Earley (born 1962), Irish cyclist
Mary Two-Axe Earley (1911–1996), Canadian indigenous women's rights activist
Paul Earley (born 1964), Irish sportsman
Pete Earley (born 1951), American journalist and writer
Richard Earley (born 1944), American diver
Sean Earley (1953-1992), American artist
Tim Earley (born 1972), American poet
Tom Earley (1917–1988), American baseball pitcher
Tony Earley (born 1961), American writer
English toponymic surnames